Crenicichla nickeriensis is a species of cichlid native to South America. It is found in the Nickerie and Corantijn River basins in Suriname.

References

nickeriensis
Fish of Suriname
Taxa named by Alex Ploeg
Fish described in 1987